Tina Clayton may refer to:

 Tina Lord, also known as Tina Clayton, fictional character from the American daytime soap opera One Life to Live
 Tina Clayton (athlete) (born 2004), Jamaican athlete